Avakian (also spelled Avagian, Avagyan, Avakyan, or Avak'yan) is a name of Armenian origin. It derives from the Armenian word avag, meaning "oldest", "old", or "big", perhaps signifying that a male ancestor was a prominent individual in his community. It may also mean "son of Avak".

People 
 Henri Avagyan, Armenian footballer 
 Bob Avakian (1943-), chairman of the Revolutionary Communist Party, USA
 Emik Avakian (1923–2013), American inventor of Armenian descent and owner of numerous patents
 George Avakian (1919-2017), jazz record producer

See also 
 Armenian surnames
 Avak (disambiguation)

Notes 

Armenian-language surnames